Said O'Reilly to McNab is a 1937 British comedy film directed by William Beaudine and starring Will Mahoney, Will Fyffe and Ellis Drake. It was made at Islington Studios by Gainsborough Pictures. The film's sets were designed by the art director Alex Vetchinsky. Leslie Arliss and Marriott Edgar wrote the screenplay.

Plot
American confidence trickster Timothy O'Reilly has to flee New York with the law after him for his dubious business activities. He goes with his loyal, quick-thinking secretary across the Atlantic to Scotland where his son Terence is living. He finds Terence is in love with the daughter of Malcolm McNab, a tight-fisted local businessman. The two engage in a certain amount of rivalry while O'Reilly tries to find a way to refresh his financial fortune and get McNab's permission for their children to marry. These include a game of golf at which both try to cheat and a miracle new dieting pill which is in fact just a caramel sweet.

Cast
 Will Mahoney as Colonel Timothy O'Reilly
 Will Fyffe as Malcolm McNab
 Ellis Drake as Mrs McNab
 Jean Winstanley as Mary McNab
 James Carney as Terence O'Reilly
 Sandy McDougal as Jock McKay
 Marianne Davis as Sophie
 Lillian Urquhart as Maggie
 Percy Parsons as Mr Dunkel
 Robert Gall as Jock Mc Nab

References

Bibliography
 Marshall, Wendy L. William Beaudine: from silents to television. Scarecrow Press, 2005.
 Wood, Linda. British Films, 1927-1939. British Film Institute, 1986.

External links

1937 films
1937 comedy films
1930s English-language films
Films directed by William Beaudine
British comedy films
Films set in Scotland
Islington Studios films
Gainsborough Pictures films
Films with screenplays by Marriott Edgar
Films about con artists
Films scored by Jack Beaver
British black-and-white films
1930s British films